The 2013 European Table Tennis Championships were held in Schwechat, Austria from 4–13 October 2013. Venue for the competition is Multiversum.

Medal summary

Men's events

Women's events

Medal table

Results

Men's singles

Men's doubles

Men's team

Women's singles

Women's doubles

Women's team

References

External links
Official website

2013
European Championships
International sports competitions hosted by Austria
Table Tennis European Championships
October 2013 sports events in Europe
Table tennis competitions in Austria
Schwechat
Sport in Lower Austria